Darren Harry, OAM (born 11 November 1975 in Wonthaggi, Victoria)  is an Australian Paralympic tandem cycling pilot.  He won a gold medal at the 2000 Sydney Games in the men's tandem sprint open event with Paul Clohessy, for which he received a Medal of the Order of Australia.

References

Paralympic cyclists of Australia
Cyclists at the 2000 Summer Paralympics
Paralympic gold medalists for Australia
Paralympic sighted guides
Recipients of the Medal of the Order of Australia
Living people
Cyclists from Victoria (Australia)
1975 births
People from Wonthaggi
Australian male cyclists
Medalists at the 2000 Summer Paralympics
Paralympic medalists in cycling